Sarah Bridges Stebbins, a Philadelphian better known under the pen name Sallie Bridges (1830-1910), was an American poet, best known today for her adaptations of Arthurian legend.

Writing career
Bridges's Marble Isle (1864) is a collection of poetic adaptations from Thomas Malory's Le Morte d'Arthur. According to Daniel Helbert, she is the first American writer "to truly adapt and interpret Malory's text as a comprehensive literary enterprise".

Annals of a Baby, first published anonymously and in 1878 and republished, with the author's full name, in 1882, is a humorous look at motherhood and family life; it tells of the birth and growth of a nameless baby in a world of stock characters--the Young Mother, the Young Aunties, the Fat Nurse, etc. The book was published in the "Helen's Babies" series.

Bibliography

Poetry

References

External links
Marble Isle (1864)

1830 births
1910 deaths
19th-century American poets
American women poets
Writers from Philadelphia